Ravi is a South Korean rapper, songwriter and producer, signed under Jellyfish Entertainment. He began his career as a rapper in 2012 in the South Korean boy group VIXX, and later formed VIXX's first sub-unit VIXX LR with bandmate Leo in 2015. Ravi's songwriting career began with his participation in co-writing VIXX's debut single "Super Hero". As of November 2016 with the release of VIXX 2016 Conception Ker, Ravi has contributed to the writing and composing of over 46 songs recorded by VIXX. Ravi is widely known for his participation of composing and songwriting rap portions for the group as well as lyrics and music.

VIXX albums

The credits for the Korean releases are adapted from the official homepage of his group VIXX.

VIXX LR albums

The credits for the Korean releases are adapted from the official homepage of his group VIXX sub-unit VIXX LR.

Solo albums

Other work

See also
 List of songs recorded by VIXX

References

External links
  
 

VIXX
Ravi